Tenge may refer to:

Kazakhstani tenge, the currency of Kazakhstan
Teňňe or tenge, one hundredth of a manat, the currency of Turkmenistan
A Japanese reading of the sinoxenic term Tianxia (天下)
Josh Tenge, American sandboarder